Macrobathra latipterophora is a moth in the family Cosmopterigidae. It was described by H.H. Li and X.P. Wang in 2004. It is found in China (Hubei).

References

Natural History Museum Lepidoptera generic names catalog

Macrobathra
Moths described in 2004